Annie Jean Easley (April 23, 1933 – June 25, 2011) was an American computer scientist, mathematician, and rocket scientist. She worked for the Lewis Research Center (now Glenn Research Center) of the National Aeronautics and Space Administration (NASA) and its predecessor, the National Advisory Committee for Aeronautics (NACA). She was a leading member of the team which developed software for the Centaur rocket stage, and was one of the first African-Americans to work at NASA. Easley was posthumously inducted into the Glenn Research Hall of Fame in 2015. On February 1, 2021, a crater on the moon was named after Easley by the IAU.

Education
Before the Civil Rights Movement, educational and career opportunities for African-American children were very limited. Segregation was prevalent, African-American children were educated separately from white children, and their schools were often inferior to white schools. Annie's mother told her that she could be anything, but she would have to work at it. She encouraged Annie to get a good education. From the fifth grade through high school, Annie attended Holy Family High School, and was valedictorian of her graduating class. At a young age Annie had interest in becoming a nurse, but around the age of 16 she decided to study pharmacy.

In 1950, Easley enrolled in classes at Xavier University in New Orleans, an African-American Catholic university, and majored in pharmacy for about two years.

In 1977, she obtained a Bachelor of Science in Mathematics from Cleveland State University.

Career

In 1955, Easley read a story in a local newspaper about twin sisters who worked for the National Advisory Committee for Aeronautics (NACA) as "computers". She applied for a job the next day, and was hired two weeks later - one of four African Americans out of about 2500 employees. She began her career as computer at the NACA Lewis Flight Propulsion Laboratory (which became NASA Lewis Research Center, 1958–1999, and subsequently the John H. Glenn Research Center) in Cleveland, Ohio. Later after electronic computers started being used at NASA her title changed to mathematician and computer technician. Even with a degree, at NASA, Easley also had to complete internal specialization courses to be considered a professional. Easley was denied financial aid that other employees received for education, without explanation from the agency. She also noted that she did not feel that her pay was very high when she first started with two years of college. Although she was promised a GS-3 in her interview, her first paycheck was a GS-2, and when she questioned it she was told there were no more GS-3s available.

Easley's outreach for minorities did not end with her volunteer work at college career days. At NASA she took upon herself to be an Equal Employment Opportunity (EEO) counselor. This was one of the formal ways that she helped her supervisors at NASA address discrimination complaints from all levels. She was also part of a recruitment effort on behalf of NASA for engineering students from numerous colleges.

Her 34-year career included developing and implementing computer code that analyzed alternative power technologies, supported the Centaur high-energy upper rocket stage, determined solar, wind and energy projects, and identified energy conversion systems and alternative systems to solve energy problems. During the 1970s Easley worked on a project examining damage to the ozone layer. With massive cuts in the NASA space program, Easley began working on energy problems; her energy assignments included studies to determine the life use of storage batteries, such as those used in electric utility vehicles. Her computer applications have been used to identify energy conversion systems that offer the improvement over commercially available technologies. Following the energy crisis of the late 1970s Easley studied the economic advantages of co-generating power plants that obtained byproducts from coal and steam. After retiring in 1989, she remained an active participant in the Speaker's Bureau and the Business & Professional Women's association. Despite her long career and numerous contributions to research, she was cut out of NASA's promotional photos. In response to one such event, Easley responded by saying "I'm out here to do a job and I knew I had the ability to do it, and that's where my focus was, on getting the job done. I was not intentionally trying to be a pioneer." which showed that she placed her work and solving problems before everything else.

Easley's work with the Centaur project helped lay the technological foundations for future space shuttle launches and launches of communication, military and weather satellites. Her work contributed to the 1997 flight to Saturn of the Cassini probe, the launcher of which had the Centaur as its upper stage.

Annie Easley was interviewed in Cleveland on August 21, 2001, by Sandra Johnson. The interview is stored in the National Aeronautics and Space Administration Johnson Space Center Oral History Program. The 55 page interview transcript includes material on the history of the Civil Rights Movement, Glenn Research Center, Johnson Space Center, space flight, and the contribution of women to space flight. In that same Interview, Easley was asked whether she still played with gadgets and stated "I don't have the time or the desire. I will get the email and I'll send it, but I don't play with it. It's not like this fascinating thing I play with. I'd much rather be out doing something actively, like on the golf course or doing other things."

Easley lived in a time where women and African-Americans were facing discrimination from society, although she prided herself in her work ethic and achieved her goals nonetheless.  She also experienced some discrimination related to being an African-American during her career, especially with the picture-cutting incident at her work, when her face was cut out from a picture to put it on display. In her 34-year career she worked in four different departments: the Computer Services Division, the Energy Directorate, the Launch Vehicles Group and the Engineering Directorate, although none of her moves were due to promotions, which she recognized may have been due to her race or sex.

Throughout the 1970s, Easley advocated for and encouraged female and minority students at college career days to work in STEM careers. She tutored elementary and high school children as well as young adults who had dropped out of school in a work-study program.

Easley was also a budding athlete who founded and subsequently became the first President of the NASA Lewis Ski Club and participated in other local ski clubs in the Cleveland area.

Personal life
Annie Easley was born to Samuel Bird Easley and Mary Malvina Hoover in Birmingham, Alabama. She was raised by her mother and had a brother six years her senior.

In 1954, Annie Easley married a man from the military. After her husband had been discharged from the military, the two of them moved to Cleveland, Ohio to be near his family.

She had the intention of continuing her studies in Cleveland, but unfortunately, the local university had ended its pharmacy program a short time before and no nearby alternative existed.

After divorcing her husband, Easley returned to Birmingham. As part of the Jim Crow laws that maintained racial inequality, African Americans were required to pass a literacy test and pay a poll tax in order to vote, which was outlawed in 1964 in the Twenty-fourth Amendment. She remembered the test giver looking at her application and saying only, "You went to Xavier University. Two dollars."  Subsequently, she helped other African-Americans prepare for the test.

Easley had always loved dressing up. She wore stockings and heels almost every day in college. Although there was no dress code in her work department, wearing pants as a woman during that time was still not normalized. However, she was one of the first to wear pants to work in the 1970s after talking to her supervisor about it.

In her first three years after retiring from NASA, Easley focused on volunteer work, often telling people she put more miles on her car as a retiree than as a worker. She traveled the world, mostly to ski, and become an independent contractor in real estate. Although she no longer tutored, she expressed that she was always willing to talk to students at career days and similar events if asked.

Selected works
 Performance and Operational Economics Estimates for a Coal Gasification Combined-Cycle Cogeneration Powerplant. Nainiger, Joseph J.; Burns, Raymond K.; Easley, Annie J. NASA, Lewis Research Center, Cleveland, Ohio. NASA Tech Memo 82729 Mar 1982 31p
 Bleed Cycle Propellant Pumping in a Gas-Core Nuclear Rocket Engine System. Kascak, A. F.; Easley, A. J. National Aeronautics and Space Administration. Lewis Research Center, Cleveland, Ohio. Report No.: NASA-TM-X-2517; E-6639 March 1972
 Effect of Turbulent Mixing on Average Fuel Temperatures in a Gas-Core Nuclear Rocket Engine. Easley, A. J.; Kascak, A. F.; National Aeronautics and Space Administration. Lewis Research Center, Cleveland, Ohio. Report No.: NASA-TN-D-4882 Nov 1968

See also 
Katherine Johnson
List of African-American women in STEM fields

References

Further reading
 Black Contributors to Science and Energy Technology. US Department of Energy (Washington, D.C.: Office of Public Affairs), 1979, p. 19. DOE/OPA-0035 (79).
 The ACM-Mills Conference on Pioneering Women in Computing. Mills College, Oakland, California. May 7, 2000
 In Black and White: A Guide to Magazine Articles, Newspaper Articles and Books Concerning More than 15,000 Black Individuals and Groups. 3rd edition Mary Mace Spradling, ed. (Detroit, Michigan: Gale Research Co.), 1980. p. 289.
 "Easley, Annie J.: American Computer Scientist" in World of Computer Science.  Brigham Narin, Ed. (Detroit, Michigan: Gales Group), 2002. p. 210.

External links
BookRags Biography
The Faces of Science Biography
NASA Glen Research Center
 Annie Easley

1933 births
2011 deaths
African-American women engineers
American women engineers
African-American engineers
African-American mathematicians
20th-century American mathematicians
21st-century American mathematicians
American women mathematicians
Cleveland State University alumni
People from Birmingham, Alabama
Xavier University of Louisiana alumni
American women computer scientists
American computer scientists
Women rocket scientists
Mathematicians from Alabama
Engineers from Alabama
Computer programmers
Software engineers
20th-century women engineers
21st-century women engineers
20th-century women mathematicians
21st-century women mathematicians
African-American academics
African-American computer scientists
20th-century African-American women
20th-century African-American people
21st-century American women
21st-century African-American women
21st-century African-American people
NASA people